Commandant ( or ) is a title often given to the officer in charge of a military (or other uniformed service) training establishment or academy. This usage is common in English-speaking nations. In some countries it may be a military or police rank. It is also often used to refer to the commander of a military prison or prison camp (including concentration camps and prisoner of war camps).

Bangladesh 
In Bangladesh Armed Forces commandant is not any rank. It is an appointment. The commandant serves as the head of any military training institutes or unit.

Canada
Commandant is the normal Canadian French-language term for the commanding officer of a mid-sized unit, such as a regiment or battalion, within the Canadian Forces. In smaller units, the commander is usually known in French as the officier commandant.

Conversely, in Canadian English, the word commandant is used exclusively for the commanding officers of military units that provide oversight and/or services to a resident population (such as a military school or college, a long-term health care facility or a detention facility.

France
In the French Army and French Air Force, the term commandant is used as a rank equivalent to major (NATO rank code OF-3).  However, in the French Navy commandant is the style, but not the rank, of the senior officers, specifically capitaine de corvette, capitaine de frégate and capitaine de vaisseau.

Germany
In the German language, a military Kommandant is the commanding officer of a military installation (e.g. a fortress), vehicle, aircraft (the pilot is not always Kommandant, if another crew member has a higehr rank) or vessel (e.g. U-Boot-Kommandant). In contrast to the governor, the fortress commandant of the Imperial German Army or the Wehrmacht never had higher but only lower jurisdiction. When subordinate to a governor, his duties were limited to garrison duty. Subordinate to him was the Platzmajor.

In the navy of the Bundeswehr, commandants, including former commandants, wear the special commandant badge. When the commandant is active, it is worn on the right side of the chest above the breast pocket. Former commandants wear it on the left breast under the name tag.

In Baden-Württemberg, Bavaria, Austria, Switzerland and South Tyrol, the head of the volunteer fire brigade is called the Kommandant. As such, he leads the fire brigade and is responsible for the training and deployment of his local fire brigade. In his own local area, he leads the operations management of all fire brigades as long as this is not taken over by the higher-level operations management.

India

Central Armed Police Forces (CAPF) - Ministry of Home Affairs.
In the Central Armed Police Forces (BSF, CRPF, CISF, ITBP, SSB), 'Commandant' is a rank. It is equivalent to the rank of Senior Superintendent of Police or Colonel of Army. Commandant rank officers generally command battalions in CAPFs.

Armed Forces - Ministry of Defence.
In the Indian Armed Forces, 'Commandant' is not a rank but an appointment.
Commandant is the title of the heads of the Training establishments.
Examples include:
 Commandant of the National Defence Academy
 Commandant of the Indian Military Academy
 Commandant of the National Defence College
 Commandant of Indian Naval Academy
 Commandant of the Armed Forces Medical College
In the Indian Army, the Commanding Officer of an armoured regiment or a Mechanized infantry regiment (Mechanised Infantry Regiment, Brigade of The Guards) is known as the Commandant.

Commandant is also a rank in the Indian Coast Guard

Ireland

In the Irish Army, commandant (Comdt) is the equivalent of major in other armies. Irish Army commandants can sometimes be referred to as major if serving overseas under the umbrella of the United Nations or the European Union to alleviate misunderstanding.

Kenya

Kenya Defence Forces
In the Kenya Defence Forces  Commandant is an appointment. Commandant is the title of the head of the training institutions . Examples include:

 Commandant of the Recruits Training School
 Commandant of the Kenya Military Academy 
 Commandant of the National Defence College
 Commandant of the Defence Staff College 
 Commandant of School of Infantry

National Police Service
In the National Police Service , the title of Commandant is reserved for  commanders of large training institutions  or commanders of large independent units. As with the  Army, the post of a commander of a medium size unit is referred to as the Commanding Officer (CO) while the smallest is Officer Commanding (OC).

Example:

 Commandant of the General Service Unit (GSU)
 Commandant National Police College Embakasi A Campus 
 Commandant Rapid Deployment 
 Commandant Kenya Airports Police Unit

Philippines
In the Philippines, a Commandant is an appointment and not a rank but once selected, the appointee is promoted to the highest rank on the service. Commandants are appointed by the President of the Philippines either after the incumbent retires or as a replacement after dismissal.

There are currently two Commandant appointments that exist in the Philippines namely:

 Commandant of the Philippine Marine Corps; and
 Commandant of the Philippine Coast Guard

The Commandant of the Philippine Marine Corps will be promoted to the rank of Major General (Two-star Rank) once appointed while the Commandant of the Philippine Coast Guard will be promoted to the rank of an Admiral (Four-star Rank).

South Africa

In South Africa, Commandant was the title of the commanding officer of a commando (militia) unit in the 19th and early 20th centuries.

During the First World War, Commandant was used as a title by officers commanding Defence Rifle Association units, also known as Burgher commandoes. The commandoes were militia units raised in emergencies and constituted the third line of defence after the Permanent Force and the part-time Active Citizen Force regiments. The commandant rank was equivalent to major or lieutenant-colonel, depending on the size of the commando.

From 1950 to 1994 commandant (rank) was the rank equivalent of lieutenant colonel. and commander of a battalion. The rank was used by both the Army and the Air Force. The naval equivalent was commander [kommandeur in Afrikaans]. The rank was not used by the South African Police, who continued with lieutenant colonel [luitenant-kolonel].

The rank insignia for a Commandant (Kommandant in Afrikaans) was initially a crown over a five-pointed star. In 1957 the crown was replaced by a pentagonal castle device  based on the floor plan of the Castle of Good Hope in Cape Town, South Africa's oldest military building. In 1994, the rank of Commandant / Kommandant reverted to lieutenant colonel.

From 1968 to 1970, a related rank, Chief Commandant, existed in the commando forces (the part-time, territorial reserve, roughly equivalent to a National Guard or Home Guard).

Recently, use of the term has followed the standard practice, i.e. the commanding officer of a training institute.

New Zealand
In the New Zealand Defence Force, the term commandant is used for the senior officer (or commander) of garrisoned units that do not deploy and are not operational. This typically includes learning institutes such as the New Zealand Defence College, the New Zealand Cadet Force, and (formerly) the Command and Staff College. The title could also be used for other non-deploying units such as the Services Corrective Establishment in Burnham, or depot-level engineering units.

The equivalent term for operational units is 'commander', such as commander of the Joint Force Headquarters New Zealand.

Under the 2010 creation of the Training and Education Directorate, an additional position of commandant was established for the Training Institute to complement the commandant of the Defence College.

Singapore 
In the National Police Cadet Corps (NPCC), the position of Commandant is given to a Singapore Police Force officer who heads NPCC. The Commandant is aided by his Assistant Commandants, who are NPCC officers. As NPCC units around Singapore are divided into 20 "areas", each area is headed by an Area Commandant who is an NPCC officer. This Area Commandant is also usually an Officer from one of the units in the area that he/she is taking charge of.

Sri Lanka
In Sri Lanka, the Commandant of the Volunteer Force is the head of the Sri Lanka Army Volunteer Force. Commandant is also the title used for the commanding officer (one-star rank) of military academies - Sri Lanka Military Academy, Naval and Maritime Academy and Air Force Academy - and the commanding officer (two-star rank) of the Defence Services Command and Staff College. It is also the title of the de facto vice-chancellor of the General Sir John Kotelawala Defence University, usually an officer of two-star rank.

Colonel-commandant is an honorary post in corps of the army and the Sri Lanka National Guard, similar to that of Colonel of the Regiment found in infantry regiments. The post of centre commandant is the commanding officer of a corps or regiment. Commandant is the head of the Special Task Force of the Sri Lanka Police.

United Kingdom
In the British Armed Forces, a commandant is usually the commanding officer of a training establishment, such as the Royal Military Academy Sandhurst or the Royal Air Force College Cranwell. In  early 19th century  England, the term commandant was used  interchangeably with commandment - i.e., a person could act as  a Commandment of the Justices -  an officer-in-charge. 

Colonel-commandant was an appointment which existed in the British Army between 1922 and 1928, and in the Royal Marines from 1755 to some time after World War II. It replaced brigadier-general in the army, and was itself replaced by brigadier in both the army and the Marines. The colonel-commandant is also the ceremonial head of some Army corps and this position is usually held by a senior general.

Commandant was also the appointment, equivalent to commodore, held by the director of the Women's Royal Naval Service between 1951 and 1993.

In the Army Cadet Force, a colonel is customarily the most senior commissioned officer in charge of an ACF county. This rank is thus known as the commandant and their second-in-command (2IC) is the deputy commandant, who has the rank of lieutenant colonel.

In the Royal Air Force Air Cadets, the officer in charge of the organisation is given the title Commandant Air Cadets and holds the position for two years.

Formerly, commandant was the usual title for the head of the Special Constabulary within a police force. In some forces, the title was chief commandant, with subordinate divisional or sub-divisional commandants. The standard title for this position is now chief officer.

In the Voluntary Aid Organisation in World War I, the chief officer of a military hospital or voluntary aid detachment (VAD), whether male or female, held the title of commandant.

United States
In the United States, "commandant" is an appointment, not a rank, and the following three appointments currently exist:
 Commandant of the Marine Corps
 Commandant of the Coast Guard
 Commandant of the Operations (Ships)

Formerly, admirals were appointed as commandants of naval districts.

The commandant is the second most senior officer (after the superintendent) of United States Service academies, such as West Point, United States Naval Academy, and the United States Air Force Academy, equivalent to the Dean of Students at a civilian college. Commandant is also the title of the commanding officer of many units of the United States Army Training and Doctrine Command, including the non-commissioned officer academies, whose commandants are typically command sergeants major.

Commandant is also the title of the ranking officer in charge of each War college of the United States military, and is responsible for the administration, academic progress and success of the civilians and military officers assigned to the college. The commandant is a model for all personnel, a military academy graduate of impeccable character and bearing who has demonstrated accomplishment in both academic excellence and active military service in the field. They include the Naval War College, the USAF Air War College, the Army War College, the Marine Corps War College and the National War College.

Commandant is the duty title for the commanding officer of the US Air Force Test Pilot School.

Commandant is also the duty title of the senior enlisted leader of a Professional Military Education (PME) academy, such as the Airman Leadership School, Non-Commissioned Officer Academy, and Senior Non-Commissioned Officer Academy.

The title may also be used for the commander of a unit headquarters, who is usually responsible for administrative matters such as billeting and is called the headquarters commandant; this may also be a duty assigned to a staff officer in large headquarters.

See also
 Commandant general, in Fascist Italy, was the head of the Milizia Volontaria per la Sicurezza Nazionale (National Security Volunteer Militia or "Blackshirts"), a position held by Benito Mussolini.
 Commandant's Service, a military police type force in some militaries.

References

External links

Military appointments
Titles